Socoroma is a village in the Arica and Parinacota Region, Chile.
It lies off Ruta 11 at km 99. It is an old Aymara settlement into which significant investment has been made to try to stop it from becoming a complete ghost town. It has a well-ordered church and plaza. The traditional houses are now mostly covered with corrugated iron instead of grass and leather.

References

Populated places in Parinacota Province